Serendib competed at the 2019 Special Olympics World Summer Games in Abu Dhabi, United Arab Emirates from 14 to 21 March 2019. This was Sri Lanka's third participation at the Special Olympics World Summer Games since making its debut at the 2011 Special Olympics World Summer Games.

20 athletes competed at the multi-sporting event in 5 different sports. Serendib clinched 4 medals at the event including 2 gold medals and 2 silver medals. Kavinda Rathuwaduge and Vinoth Mudalige claimed silver medal in the unified badminton men's doubles event which was not included as a part of Serendib medal tally during the games.

Participants

Medallists

References 

Nations at the 2019 Special Olympics World Summer Games
2019 in Sri Lankan sport